Ovidijus Verbickas (born 4 July 1993) is a Lithuanian professional footballer who plays as a midfielder for Lithuanian club Žalgiris and Lithuania national team.

History
Since the summer of 2011, Verbickas played for the youth squad of Zenit, the first match for him was played in August 2011, coming on as a substitute in the game against FC Krasnodar. In total, Ovidijus played 58 matches for the Zenit youth team and scored 6 goals. In September 2012, he was included in to "Zenit" team at the 2012–13 UEFA Champions League.

On 6 March 2014, he was loaned out to Lithuanian A Lyga vice-champions Atlantas.

On 21 January 2020, he signed with Kazakhstan Premier League club FC Taraz.

In January 2021, he joined Lithuanian club FK Žalgiris.

International goals
Scores and results list Armenia's goal tally first.

Honours
Individual
 A Lyga Player of the Year: 2018
 A Lyga Player of the Month: April 2018

References

External links
 

1993 births
Living people
Lithuanian footballers
Lithuania international footballers
Lithuania under-21 international footballers
Association football midfielders
FK Atlantas players
FC Zenit Saint Petersburg players
FC Taraz players
A Lyga players
Segunda División B players
Lithuanian expatriate footballers
Expatriate footballers in Spain
Lithuanian expatriate sportspeople in Spain
Expatriate footballers in Russia
Expatriate footballers in Kazakhstan